Anamaduwa (Sinhala: ආණමඩුව) is a town in Puttalam District, North Western Province, Sri Lanka.

Etymology
There are few stories around the name of Anamaduwa. According to one such story, after uniting the country King Dutugemunu had given precious gifts to Nandimitra, one of the ten giant warriors belonged to the king. Nandimitra was given an area in the south-west region of Anuradhapura and he settled himself there with his battalion of Elephants. It is believed that the elephants were housed in an elephant kraal ( In Sinhalaː Ali Maduwa) where in the present day Anamaduwa is situated. As the time went and the influence brought in by the Tamil language to the area, Ali Maduwa had become to Anei Madam and then evolved to current name of Anamaduwa.

Tourist attractions
 Paramakanda Vihara, is an ancient Buddhist temple located on Paramakanda Rock in Anamaduwa. The vihara has been designated as one of archaeological protected places in Sri Lanka.
 Thonigala Rock Inscription, is a rock inscription found on a rock in anamaduwa. Presently, the inscription has been designated as an archaeological protected monument.

See also
 Navagattegama

References

External links 
 Anamaduwa Divisional Secretariat

Towns in Puttalam District